Osman Mema (born 2 July 1939) was an Albanian professional footballer who played as a midfielder. His is one of the most decorated players in the history of Albanian football, having won the Albanian National Championship 7 times.

Club career
Mema, like the rest of his siblings, was a product of 17 Nëntori Academy, earning his promotion in 1958 after winning two consecutive championships. Soon after that, he was called for the military service and joined the county's army team Partizani. Mema enjoyed great success there, playing with footballers such as Refik Resmja and Panajot Pano, winning the championship three times and the Republic Cup twice .

In 1965, at his father's request, Mema, who at that time was Partizani's most paid player, made a sensational return to 17 Nëntori winning four championships, whom he stayed until 1971, the year in which he decided to end his career. He was able to play with his brother Ali in his second spell, helping the club to win three more league titles.

Style of play
In his prime, Mema was noted for his acceleration, speed, stamina and work rate. He played as a defensive midfielder, but nevertheless he also tended to make runs forward, which also made him an attacking threat.

Personal life
Osman was part of Mema dynasty, a family which has produced several footballers throughout the years. His brothers Haxhi and Ali were both footballers, as well as his nephew and Haxhi's son Sulejman, and Ali's son Ardian, who was also a footballer who played mostly for Tirana and is currently its coach.

References

External links
Profile at Football Database

1938 births
Living people
Footballers from Tirana
Albanian footballers
Association football midfielders
KF Tirana players
FK Partizani Tirana players
Kategoria Superiore players